Calathes is a Greek surname. Notable people with the surname include:

Nick Calathes (born 1989), Greek-American basketball player in the National Basketball Association, brother of Pat Calathes
Pat Calathes (born 1985), Greek-American basketball player, brother of Nick Calathes

Greek-language surnames
Surnames